Darby Creek may refer to:

Darby Creek (Pennsylvania), a tributary of the Delaware River
Two streams in central Ohio:
 Big Darby Creek
 Little Darby Creek (Ohio)
Darby Creek Publishing, an imprint of Lerner Publishing Group

See also 
 Little Darby Creek (disambiguation)